Benito Salas Airport is an airport that serves the city of Neiva, the capital of the Huila Department in Colombia. It was named after Benito Salas Vargas, a military and social leader during Colombia's (then known as New Granada) independence war (1810–1819).

The airport is in a rebuilding process that includes a new control tower and a new building with garages. It was formerly known as "La Manguita airport" because it is placed in an old ranch with that name; even today people call it "La Manguita".

Airlines and destinations

Accidents and incidents
On 8 January 1975, Douglas DC-3 FAC-688 of SATENA crashed shortly after take-off on a flight to Gustavo Artunduaga Paredes Airport, Florencia. All 30 people on board died.

See also
Transport in Colombia
List of airports in Colombia

References

External links 
Benito Salas Airport at OurAirports

Airports in Colombia
Buildings and structures in Huila Department